Amariah means "promised by God" in Hebrew. 
It was commonly used as a name of priests in the History of ancient Israel and Judah.  It appear several times in the Hebrew Bible:

One of the descendants of Aaron by Eleazar. He was probably the last of the high priests of Eleazar's line prior to the transfer of that office to Eli, of the line of Ithamar.
A Levite, son of Hebron, of the lineage of Moses.
An ancestor of Ezra. 
One of the high priests in the time of Hezekiah. 
Great-grandfather of Zephaniah (Zephaniah 1:1). 
Great-grandfather of Athaiah. 
One of the persons who sealed the covenant. 
One of the persons who had taken 'strange wives'.

High Priest 
Patrilineal ancestry as per 1 Chronicles chapter 5

References

Set index articles on Hebrew Bible people